Sholayur is a village in the Palakkad district, state of Kerala, India. It forms a part of the Sholayur grama panchayat.

Demographics
 India census, Sholayur had a population of 7,526 with 3,838 males and 3,688 females.

References

Villages in Palakkad district